Hoplia trifasciata, the three lined hoplia, is a species of scarab beetle in the family Scarabaeidae. It is found in the eastern United States and Canada.

References

Further reading

 

Melolonthinae
Articles created by Qbugbot
Beetles described in 1825